Harbour View is a suburb of Lower Hutt City situated at the bottom of the North Island of New Zealand. The suburb is located on the western side of the Hutt River and State Highway 2.

References

Suburbs of Lower Hutt